Nike Asp was an American sounding rocket. The Nike Asp has a ceiling of 220 km, a takeoff thrust of 217 kN, a takeoff weight of 700 kg, a diameter of 0.42 m and a length of 7.90 m.

The Nike-Asp is an Asp rocket with a Nike booster system. It was at times ship-launched. After NASA took control of the project, the rocket fell into disuse.

USS Point Defiance (LSD-31)

USS Point Defiance (LSD-31) became one of the first rocket-launching surface ships to support the 1958 IGY Solar Eclipse Expedition to the Danger Island region of the South Pacific. Launchers on deck fired eight Nike-Asp model LV sounding rockets to collect scientific data during the eclipse. Each USN solar XUV and X-ray detection launch (5 as a salvo) was from 40.0° N 150.0° W on Oct 12 1958 - at 08:32, 08:42, 08:43, 08:52, and 09:10 GMT, with configuration designations: NN8.59F - NN8.62F and successive apogee achievements of 222, 236, 242, 240, and 88 km.

Vandenberg Air Force Base

Between Jul 14 and Aug 31 1959,  five Nike-Asps were launched as part of the solar X-ray mission by the US Navy. The last launch on Aug 31 1959 at 22:53 GMT carried the Sunflare II solar X-ray detection system to an apogee of 200 km.

Eglin Air Force Base

In an unsuccessful effort to measure lunar X-ray emission, the USAF launched the last Nike-Asp on Sep 27 1960 at 22:10 GMT to an apogee of 233 km.

References

External links
https://web.archive.org/web/20171108000000/http://www.astronautix.com/lvs/nikeasp.htm

Nike (rocket family)